Strings is the debut album of the Pakistani pop band Strings, released in the year 1990. The album was recorded at the EMI Studios in Karachi and was produced by lead guitarist Bilal Maqsood. Singles from the album included "Pyar Se Phir", "Yeh Hai Pyar Ka Saman" and "Jab Se Tum Ko".

Track listing
All songs are written by Anwar Maqsood, those which are not are mentioned below.
All songs are composed by Bilal Maqsood.

Personnel
All information is taken from the CD.

Strings
Faisal Kapadia - vocals, backing vocals
Bilal Maqsood - vocals, lead guitars
Rafiq Wazir Ali - keyboard, synthesizer
Kareem Bashir Bhoy - bass guitars

Production
Produced by Bilal Maqsood
Recorded & Mixed at EMI Studios in Karachi, Pakistan

External links
Official Website

1990 debut albums
Strings (band) albums
Urdu-language albums